The Japan American Football Association oversees junior high school, high school, collegiate, club, and corporate American football teams throughout Japan. Since 1984, the JAFA has organized and sponsored the Rice Bowl, a championship game played between the college national champion and the X-League champion. It also organizes the Japan national American football teams.

History
Established in 1934, the JAFA consists of approximately 390 teams. JAFA has three different football leagues made up of 64 corporate-sponsored professional teams, 220 university teams, and 106 high school teams.

See also
International Federation of American Football (IFAF)
IFAF Asia

External links
 Japan American Football Association

Asian Federation of American Football
American football in Japan
American football governing bodies
Sports organizations established in 1934
1934 establishments in Japan